RSR is a three letter acronym which may refer to:

Radio Suisse Romande the Swiss French public service radio group
Railway Safety Regulator, an agency of the South African government
Retail Systems Research, a research company for the retail industry
Former international license plate code for Southern Rhodesia
Rock Structure Rating
Rochester and Southern Railroad
Romanian Socialist Republic or Republica Socialistă România, the name of Communist Romania from 1965 to 1989
Ronald Suresh Roberts (born 1968), British West Indian biographer and columnist
Rotary Scout Reservation, a Boy Scout camp in upstate New York
RSR (spyplane), a Russian supersonic surveillance aircraft
 RSR ("RennSport Rennwagen"), race versions of the Porsche 911